59-16 Light Tank was a former Chinese light tank design which was developed during the late 1950s, originally intended as one of the "tributes to the 10th anniversary of the founding of the PRC". Within the design plans, the intended weight was planned to be approximately 16 Metric Tons with a 76 mm tank gun. However, because this tank was too weak to fight against the western tanks at that time, it was eventually set aside by the military.

See also
WZ-132
WZ-131

References

Light tanks of the People's Republic of China
Military vehicles introduced in the 1950s